denotes the first female minister of that particular department.

See also
Cabinet
Cabinet of Sri Lanka
Politics of Sri Lanka

External links
 List of female cabinet ministers of Sri Lanka

Ministers
 
Sri Lanka
Ministers
Cabinet ministers, women